Alex Morris (born 5 October 1983) is an English professional football manager, and is currently assistant manager of  club Crewe Alexandra.

Career

Playing career
Morris joined Crewe's youth system as a midfielder and was a contemporary of players including Dean Ashton, David Vaughan and Lee Bell.

He was a member of Crewe's reserve side which won the Cheshire Senior Cup in 2003. Despite injury difficulties including a stress fracture of his shin, Morris was, alongside fellow Academy graduate Chris McCready, offered a one-year contract by manager Dario Gradi in 2004. He remained part of Gradi's first team squad until 2006, but injuries prevented him from making a first-team appearance for the club and forced his early retirement as a player.

Coaching and managerial career
Morris then focussed on earning coaching qualifications, working in Crewe's Academy set-up. He was manager of Crewe's under-18 side that reached the quarter-final of the 2015 FA Youth Cup, beating Arsenal, Bolton and Fulham en route to defeat by eventual finalists Manchester City.

After club manager Steve Davis was sacked in January 2017, the new incoming manager David Artell made Morris part of his senior management team alongside assistant Kenny Lunt. Morris managed the Crewe reserve side which won the Cheshire Senior Cup in May 2017.

Some five years later, as Crewe struggled to avoid relegation from EFL League One, Artell reshuffled his management team, appointing Morris as assistant manager, with Lunt becoming player development manager. After the club was relegated with four games still to play, Crewe parted company with Artell on 11 April 2022, and Morris was appointed interim manager to the end of the 2021–22 season, with Lee Bell as his assistant.

Morris said he wanted Crewe to make the most of a "mini two-week season" comprising their final four League One fixtures, while also declaring his interest in becoming the next Crewe manager: "I'd love to take the job long-term. I've been at this club for a long, long time and I believe I have the credentials." Crewe won their first game under Morris, a 3–1 home victory over AFC Wimbledon on 15 April 2022. Morris was appointed the permanent manager on 28 April 2022.

With the Alex winless in nine games, on 4 November 2022, Morris stepped down as Crewe Alexandra manager "for compassionate reasons" and reverted to assistant manager with Bell becoming interim and eventually permanent manager.

Managerial statistics

References

1983 births
English footballers
Association football midfielders
English football managers
Crewe Alexandra F.C. players
Crewe Alexandra F.C. managers
Crewe Alexandra F.C. non-playing staff
English Football League managers
Living people